Afranthidium is a genus of bees belonging to the family Megachilidae. The species of this genus are found in Southern Asia, Africa and Australia.

Species
Afranthidium abdominale 
Afranthidium ablusum 
Afranthidium alaemon 
Afranthidium alternans 
Afranthidium angulatellum 
Afranthidium angulatum 
Afranthidium biangulatum 
Afranthidium biserratum 
Afranthidium bispinosum 
Afranthidium capicola 
Afranthidium carduele 
Afranthidium concolor 
Afranthidium controversum 
Afranthidium folliculosum 
Afranthidium hamaticauda 
Afranthidium herbsti 
Afranthidium hoplogastrum 
Afranthidium hypocapicola 
Afranthidium karrooense 
Afranthidium lebanense 
Afranthidium malacopygum 
Afranthidium melanopoda 
Afranthidium murinum 
Afranthidium nigritarse 
Afranthidium odonturum 
Afranthidium pentagonum 
Afranthidium poecilodontum 
Afranthidium polyacanthum 
Afranthidium pusillum 
Afranthidium reicherti 
Afranthidium rubellulum 
Afranthidium rubellum 
Afranthidium schulthessii 
Afranthidium silverlocki 
Afranthidium tergoangulatum 
Afranthidium villosomarginatum

References

Megachilidae